B. M. Farooq is an Indian politician and Mangalore-based businessman. His brother is former Indian National Congress MLA from Mangalore City North constituency, Mohiuddin Bava. On 4 June 2018, Farooq was elected unopposed to the Karnataka Legislative Council. Out of 11 seats, the INC won 4 seats, JD(S) 2 and BJP 5. He was the richest MLC candidate.

References

Living people
Indian National Congress politicians from Karnataka
Year of birth missing (living people)